This list of Chicago Slaughter seasons details the history of the Chicago Slaughter professional indoor football franchise and from its 2007–2009 tenure in the Continental Indoor Football League and 2010 to present run in the Indoor Football League.

One of just nine teams competing in the IFL for the 2013 season, the Chicago Slaughter are members of the United Conference. Led by longtime head coach Steve "Mongo" McMichael, the team plays their home games at the Sears Centre in Hoffman Estates, Illinois.

Continental Indoor Football League

2007 season schedule

2007 CIFL standings

2008 season schedule

2008 CIFL standings

2009 season schedule

2009 CIFL standings

Indoor Football League

2010 season schedule

2010 IFL standings

2011 season schedule

* = Kickoff Classic Game, before week 1 starts.

2011 IFL standings

2012 season schedule

* = Kickoff Classic Game, before week 1 starts.

2012 IFL standings

2013 season schedule

2013 IFL standings

References

External links
Chicago Slaughter official website
Chicago Slaughter official statistics

Chicago Slaughter 2007
Chicago Slaughter seasons